Nakhon Phanom is a town (thesaban mueang) in northeastern Thailand, capital of Nakhon Phanom Province. The town covers tambons Nai Mueang and Nong Saeng and parts of tambons At Samat and Nong Yat, all in Mueang Nakhon Phanom District. As of 2006, it had a population of 27,591.

Geography
Nakhon Phanom is on the right (west) bank of the Mekong River. The Laotian town of Thakhek lies on the other side of the Mekong. The towns are joined by the Third Thai–Lao Friendship Bridge.

Climate
Nakhon Phanom has a tropical savanna climate (Köppen climate classification Aw). Winters are dry and warm. The monsoon season runs from May through October, with heavy rain and somewhat cooler temperatures during the day, although nights remain warm.

Transportation
Route 212 runs from Nong Khai along the Mekong River through Nakhon Phanom to Mukdahan, and then south to Ubon Ratchathani. Route 22 leads west through Sakhon Nakhon to Udon Thani.

Education
The town is home to Nakhon Phanom University, which was formed in 2005 by the merger of several local schools, including the former Nakhon Phanom Rajabhat University.

Sports
Nakhon Phanom is home to the Madgoat Basketball Club, which plays in the Thailand Basketball League, the country's highest division.

References

External links

Populated places in Nakhon Phanom province
Laos–Thailand border crossings
Cities and towns in Thailand
Isan